Hilltown (or informally, The Hilltown) in Dundee, Scotland, is a mainly residential area to the north of the City Centre and lying to the south of the main circular road.

Demographics
In the 2001 census the population was 9,337, by 2011 the census recorded 6,408 following major demolition of 1960's and 70's council built multi storeys and 6-in-a-block flats.

The majority of Hilltown housing is mainly three to four storey tenement buildings as well as four tower blocks. This is shown in the census which states that flats are the main housing facility in the Hilltown at 82.0%.

The ethnicity of Hilltown is mainly White at 88%; 8.5% are Asian, 1.6% are African, and 2% of other mixed groups.

Area and boundary description

Hilltown is a true inner city location. Situated on the edge of the city centre with the Law to the north, the Hilltown area offers excellent views across the River Tay and beyond. Hilltown is one of the oldest parts of the city. This makes it distinctive from other areas in Dundee both physically and demographically. It is an area of Dundee where the effects of the decline of traditional industry have been easily identifiable. Hilltown was once a bustling place of work in the jute industry and provided accessible housing for many of the mill workers but now is mainly a residential area with a central shopping concourse running through the spine. However, these shops are somewhat in decline due to accessibility of new shopping malls within the town centre.

Most of the high-rise blocks were demolished, which has given rise to regeneration in the area. Four of the largest tower blocks (locally known as the 'Alexander Street Multis') were demolished on 31 July 2011. Butterburn Court and Bucklemaker Court were demolished on 30 June 2013.

Public open spaces and play areas have been provided at various locations across the area. The Hilltown Park was opened in September 2008 as an urban park that will attract local people and visitors to enjoy the open space available.

Education
There are four primary schools in the Hilltown:
Our Lady's RC Primary School
Rosebank Primary School
Dens Road Primary School
St Peter & Paul RC Primary School

Also the Constitution Road Campus of Dundee College was in the Hilltown.

History and Future
The area has a poor or 'interesting' reputation which began in Medieval Times, when merchant and traders offered 'free trade' outside the city walls. The unwelcome (or undesirables) were kept out of the city and eventually it became part of Dundee.
It's had a chequered past over the years but is redefining its identity and large developments of modern apartments including low cost housing and recreational facilities are springing up in quick succession.

An Episcopal Church, St Salvador’s was founded in the area in 1856 by Alexander Penrose Forbes, Bishop Of Brechin and the Reverend James Nicolson. It was primarily designed to serve as a mission to the many mill workers living in and around the Hilltown area. The building was completed and consecrated in 1874. At one time the church also had a school. The church continues its work to aid the poor of Dundee, running a busy food bank.

Notable people 
 Rev. Thomas Dick (1774–1857), church minister, science teacher, writer and astronomer.
 John Duncan (1866–1945), symbolist painter of Arthurian legends, Celtic folklore and other mythological subjects
 Ethel Moorhead (1869–1955), suffragette and painter; lived campaigned in Dundee early 20th C.
 George Kidd (1925–1998), a professional wrestler and TV broadcaster.

Crime
Despite its 'dodgy' reputation it has one of the lower crime rates in Dundee.

References

External links

Areas of Dundee